Augusto Aníbal (1887–1965) was a Brazilian film actor and singer.

In film he starred in over 15 pictures between 1923 and 1952 although his career appeared to develop in two different periods. He appeared in some of the hits of the 1920s making his screen debut in the Luiz de Barros film Augusto Anibal quer casar in 1923 as the central character. This would be immediately followed by Cavaleiro Negro an adventure film also directed by Barros in which he starred alongside Manuel F. Araujo. In the 1930s he concentrated on his singing and only appeared in one film in that decade, in Maridinho de Luxo released in 1938.

He would later make a return in the 1940s where he was once again united with Luiz de Barros, appearing in his films again such as in the musical comedy Caídos do Céu in 1946.

His last credited film was in 1952 in É Fogo na Roupa. He died in 1965.

Filmography
Augusto Anibal quer casar (1923)
Cavaleiro Negro (1923)
A Sertaneja (1924)
Gigolete (1924) .... Maneco
Sinfonia da Floresta (1929) .... Augusto
Maridinho de Luxo (1938)
Caídos do Céu (1946) .... Felizardo Boaventura
Esta é Fina (1948)
Fogo na Canjica (1948) .... Fulgêncio
Pra Lá de Boa (1949)
Eu Quero é Movimento (1949)
Meu Dia Chegará (1951)
Anjo do Lodo (1951) .... Chico
Agüenta Firme, Isidoro (1951)
Era uma Vez um Vagabundo (1952)
É Fogo na Roupa (1952)

External links and sources 

1887 births
1965 deaths
Brazilian male film actors
20th-century Brazilian male singers
20th-century Brazilian singers